Welsh literature is any literature originating from Wales or by Welsh writers:  

Welsh-language literature for literature in the Welsh language
Welsh literature in English for literature in the English language

 
Welsh culture